Hurricane Paul was a hurricane that ultimately struck Mexico as a tropical depression in October 2006. It developed from an area of disturbed weather on October 21, and slowly intensified as it moved into an area of warm waters and progressively decreasing wind shear. A strong trough turned the hurricane to the north and northeast into an area of strong vertical shear, and Paul weakened to a tropical storm on October 24. It accelerated northeastward, and after passing a short distance south of Baja California Sur the low level circulation became decoupled from the rest of the convection. Paul weakened to a tropical depression on October 25 a short distance off the coast of Mexico, and after briefly turning away from the coast it made landfall on northwestern Sinaloa on October 26.

Paul was the third hurricane to threaten western Mexico in the season, the others being Hurricanes John and Lane. Rough surf killed two people along Baja California Sur, while flooding was reported in Sinaloa. Damage totaled more than $35 million (2006 MXN, $3.2 million 2006 USD).

Meteorological history

A tropical wave moved off the coast of Africa on October 4. It moved westward across the Atlantic Ocean without development, and entered the eastern Pacific Ocean on October 18. The next day, it combined with a previously existing area of disturbed weather, resulting in a large area of convection extending northward into southern Mexico. On October 20, the system developed an area of low pressure, and began to show signs of organization. Upon forming, the depression possessed a small, tight low-level circulation beneath a well-defined mid-level circulation. Easterly wind shear initially restricted upper-level outflow as the cyclone moved to the west, a motion due to a subtropical ridge to its north.

The cloud pattern of the depression quickly became better organized as a curved band developed around intensifying deep convection, and it is estimated the system intensified into Tropical Storm Paul just six hours after forming. Easterly wind shear exposed the low level circulation to the east of the area of deep convection, though Paul continued to intensify as it moved through an area of warm waters and progressively weakening wind shear. The low level circulation gradually became more embedded within the convection as the cloud pattern improved. Early on October 22, wind shear began to decrease, which coincided with an increase of outflow on its eastern side. The storm temporarily degraded in appearance as it turned to the northwest. However, shear sharply abated over Paul late on October 22, resulting in the storm quickly gaining organization and intensifying. An eye began to develop within the convection, and Paul intensified into a hurricane early on October 23.

Located in an area of warm water temperatures and light wind shear, Hurricane Paul continued to intensify and organize; its well-defined eye was surrounded by a ring of deep convection while outflow remained strong to the north and south. A large trough located off the west coast of California turned the hurricane to the north-northwest, and later to the north. The combination of increasing shear and dry air quickly weakened Paul to a tropical storm on October 24 as its low-level circulation became detached from the diminishing convection. The storm then turned to the northeast after passing near Socorro Island. The circulation briefly became involved with the deep convection as it accelerated northeastward, though as it approached the coast of Sinaloa, the center again decoupled from the upper-level circulation. Later that day, Paul weakened to a tropical depression a short distance off the coast of Mexico, and turned to the north. Early the next day, the depression, devoid of any deep convection, made landfall near Isla Altamura in northwestern Sinaloa. Hours later, the National Hurricane Center issued the last advisory on the dissipating tropical depression.

Preparations
As Paul became a hurricane, the government of Mexico issued a hurricane watch for Baja California Sur from Agua Blanca on the west coast to La Paz on the east coast. When a weakening trend was evident as the storm turned to the northeast, the hurricane watch was replaced with a tropical storm warning.
45 hours before the storm struck land, the government of Mexico issued a tropical storm watch from Mazatlán to San Evaristo along the coast of Sinaloa. When Paul was expected to weaken to a tropical depression before landfall, the tropical storm watch for mainland Mexico was discontinued. When Paul retained tropical storm status for longer than expected, and was now expected to make landfall as a tropical storm, a tropical storm warning was issued from Mazatlán to Atlata, which was later discontinued as Paul weakened to a tropical depression.

Emergency officials near the southern tip of Baja California closed schools,  while rescue workers ordered for the evacuation of more than 1,500 people from shanty towns. Local police officers went door-to-door to inform the potentially affected residents. Buses carried the evacuated citizens to schools temporarily set up as shelters. A hotel in Cabo San Lucas informed its guests of the approaching storm, and organized indoor activities for those that stayed. Several tourists ended their vacations early and left through local airports. The threat of the storm closed the port at Cabo San Lucas, causing delays in a local fishing competition. In Sinaloa, authorities evacuated over 5,000 families in risk of flooding.

Impact

The National Hurricane Center noted that the precursor disturbance had the potential to drop heavy rainfall which could result in life-threatening flash flooding or mudslides in Oaxaca and Guerrero. However, no damage reports were received there.

In southern Baja California, a fisherman slipped off rocks due to strong seas, while an American tourist was swept out to sea due to rough surf; both were killed. Two others were killed in Sinaloa when their truck was swept away by a swollen river. Paul was the third hurricane in the year to threaten Los Cabos, the others being John and Lane. The hurricane caused little damage in the area, only producing gusty winds and some rainfall. The rainfall led to flooding, the worst of which occurred in Villa Juarez. Damage totaled more than $35 million (2006 MXN, $3.2 million 2006 USD).

See also

 Other storms of the same name
 Hurricane Sandra (2015)

References

External links

The NHC's archive on Hurricane Paul.

Paul
Paul 2006
Paul 2006
2006 in Mexico
Paul